Psychotria dallachiana is a rainforest plant growing in north eastern Australia. The fruit is food for the cassowary.

References

dallachiana
Gentianales of Australia
Flora of Queensland